Thomas Marshall Percy Grace (11 July 1890 – 8 August 1915), known as Hāmi Grace, was a New Zealand cricketer. He played in two first-class matches for Wellington from 1911 to 1914. He was killed in action during the Gallipoli campaign in World War I.

See also
 List of Wellington representative cricketers
 List of cricketers who were killed during military service

References

External links
 

1890 births
1915 deaths
New Zealand cricketers
Wellington cricketers
Cricketers from Waikato
New Zealand military personnel killed in World War I
New Zealand Army officers
New Zealand Māori soldiers
New Zealand Māori sportspeople
People educated at Wellington College (New Zealand)
New Zealand Military Forces personnel of World War I